Bolt Financial Inc. (Bolt) is an American financial technology start up that provides merchants with software to facilitate one-click online checkouts.  It was founded in 2014 in San Francisco.

History
Bolt was founded by Stanford University computer science students Ryan Breslow and Eric Feldman in 2014.  Their goal was to simplify online checkout for consumers and help independent retailers compete with Amazon, who held the patent on one-click checkout until 2017.  The company initially operated out of Breslow’s dorm room. 

In 2021 the company entered into partnerships with its first European clients  and acquired Tipser, a technology company based in Sweden. In December 2021 it raised $393 million, bringing Bolt's lifetime raise to almost $1bn. Its valuation was $11bn as of January 2022.

In February 2022 Bolt CTO and CPO Maju Kuruvilla,  previously VP and general manager of worldwide logistics and fulfillment at Amazon,  was named CEO.

References

External links
Official site

Companies established in 2014
Companies based in San Francisco